Suffolk was a county constituency of the Parliament of the United Kingdom, which returned two Members of Parliament (MPs) to the House of Commons from 1290 until 1832, when it was split into two divisions.

History

Boundaries and franchise
The constituency consisted of the historic county of Suffolk. (Although Suffolk contained a number of boroughs, each of which elected two MPs in its own right, these were not excluded from the county constituency, and owning property within the borough could confer a vote at the county election.)

As in other county constituencies the franchise between 1430 and 1832 was defined by the Forty Shilling Freeholder Act, which gave the right to vote to every man who possessed freehold property within the county valued at £2 or more per year for the purposes of land tax; it was not necessary for the freeholder to occupy his land, nor even in later years to be resident in the county at all.

Except during the period of the Commonwealth, Suffolk had two MPs elected by the bloc vote method, under which each voter had two votes. (In the nominated Barebones Parliament, five members represented Suffolk; in the First and Second Parliaments of Oliver Cromwell's Protectorate, there was a general redistribution of seats and Suffolk elected ten members. The traditional arrangements were restored from 1659.)

Political character
Elections were held at a single polling place, Ipswich, and voters from the rest of the county had to travel to the county town to exercise their franchise, which made elections almost prohibitively expensive in a county as big as Suffolk. The inconvenience of holding the elections in Ipswich, situated in one corner of the county, is emphasised by the fact that for almost all other county purposes, including the Assizes, Suffolk was divided into two sections with proceedings held at Bury St Edmunds as well as Ipswich; the arrangement must certainly have worked to the benefit of candidates whose voting strength was in East Suffolk rather than West Suffolk. It was normal for voters to expect the candidates for whom they voted to meet their expenses in travelling to the poll, and to "entertain" them – in other words provide free food and alcoholic drink – when they arrived.

Peter Jupp includes in his collection of documents relating to elections round the turn of the 19th century a contemporary account of the Suffolk election of 1790, one of the rare contested elections, which well illustrates the arrangements for treating the voters on such occasions. A committee set up to support the candidacies of Sir Charles Bunbury and Sir John Rous, "for the better regulating of the expense of maintaining the freeholders upon the days of election" issued printed tickets with the names of public houses upon them, entitling the bearer to a fixed amount of provision and maintenance – black tickets worth five shillings for the day, and red tickets worth seven shillings and sixpence for a man and horse for the night. After the election, the innkeepers presented their bills for providing this hospitality, which amounted to £3,500 for a two-day election; and the committee, much dissatisfied by the scale of these charges, declined to pay in full so that several of the publicans afterwards sued the two candidates.

Partly as a result of the expense, contested elections were rare in Suffolk (there were contests at four of the nine general elections between 1701 and 1727, but at only three of the twenty remaining before the Reform Act in 1832), and even when they took place were often only token contests. There was no dominant aristocratic interest in Suffolk, though it would probably have been impossible to defy the county's wealthier peers (such as the Duke of Grafton, Marquess Cornwallis and the Earl of Bristol) had they stood together, since no competing interest could hope to match them in an out-and-out spending contest.

In practice, the choice of members usually lay with the country squires, with matters generally settled more or less amicably by a test of strength at the county meeting with no need for the expense of a formal poll; when there was a contest, in 1784 (when three candidates stood for two seats), the weakest of the three quickly withdrew when it was clear after the first day of voting that he could not win. Nevertheless, the freeholders were not necessarily entirely deferential and manipulable by the gentry: Cannon cites the work of Professor J H Plumb, who showed in his study of Suffolk pollbooks from the reign of Queen Anne that the voters could act independently in a seriously contested election, while their humiliating rejection of their long-standing MP Thomas Sherlock Gooch in favour of a Reform Bill supporter at the tumultuous election of 1830 demonstrates similar intractability more than a century later.

Abolition
By the time of the Great Reform Act in 1832, Suffolk had a population of approximately 300,000, It was assumed to have around 5,000 qualified voters, but since no full-blooded contest had taken place in living memory this could only be an estimate. (Before the Reform Act there was no permanent register of voters). The Great Reform Act raised Suffolk's entitlement from two to four county MPs, while abolishing three of its seven boroughs. The single county constituency was abolished, being split into two divisions, East Suffolk and West Suffolk. At the first election after Reform, with a somewhat extended franchise, the electorates of these two new divisions totalled about 7,500.

Members of Parliament

1290–1640

1640–1832

Notes

References 
 Knights Of The Shire In Parliament For The County Of Suffolk.
D Brunton & D H Pennington, Members of the Long Parliament (London: George Allen & Unwin, 1954)
 John Cannon, Parliamentary Representation 1832 – England and Wales (Cambridge: Cambridge University Press, 1973)
 Cobbett's Parliamentary history of England, from the Norman Conquest in 1066 to the year 1803 (London: Thomas Hansard, 1808)
F W S Craig, British Parliamentary Election Results 1832–1885 (2nd edition, Aldershot: Parliamentary Research Services, 1989)
 Peter Jupp, British and Irish Elections 1784–1831 (Newton Abbott: David & Charles, 1973)
 Lewis Namier & John Brooke, The History of Parliament: The House of Commons 1754–1790 (London: HMSO, 1964)
 J E Neale, The Elizabethan House of Commons (London: Jonathan Cape, 1949)
 J Holladay Philbin, Parliamentary Reform 1640–1832  (New Haven: Yale University Press, 1965)
 

Parliamentary constituencies in Suffolk (historic)
Constituencies of the Parliament of the United Kingdom established in 1290
Constituencies of the Parliament of the United Kingdom disestablished in 1832